Outside or Outsides may refer to:

General
 Wilderness
 Outside (Alaska), any non-Alaska location, as referred to by Alaskans

Companies
 Outside (company), formerly Pocket Outdoor Media, a company that publishes the Outside magazine and operates Outside TV, among other ventures

Books and magazines
 Outside, a book by Marguerite Duras
 Outside (magazine), an outdoors magazine

Film, theatre and TV
 Outside TV (formerly RSN Television), a television network
 Outside (film), a 2004 short film by Jenn Kao
 "Outside", an episode of One Day at a Time (2017 TV series)

Music
 Outside (jazz), an element of musical composition/improvisation
 Outside Music, a Canadian music distributor and record label
 Outside Studios, a British recording studio, based in England

Albums
 Outside (Amar album), 2000
 Outside (David Bowie album), 1995
 Outside (Burna Boy album), 2018
 Outside (CFCF album), 2013
 Outside (Shelly Manne album), 1970
 Outside (O'Death album), 2011
 Outside (Tapes n' Tapes album), 2011
 Outsides (EP), by John Frusciante, 2013
 Outsides, an album by Arsenal, 2005

Songs
 "Outside" (David Bowie song), 1995
 "Outside" (George Michael song), 1998
 "Outside" (Staind song), 2001
 "Outside" (Calvin Harris song), 2014 featuring Ellie Goulding
 "Outside" (Foo Fighters song)
 "Outside", a song by Mariah Carey from Butterfly
 "Outside", a song by Megan Thee Stallion from Good News
 "Outside", a song by Hollywood Undead from Notes from the Underground
 "Outside", a song by The Weeknd from Echoes of Silence
 "Outside", a song by Tribe from Here at the Home
 "Outside", a song by Travis Scott featuring 21 Savage from Birds in the Trap Sing McKnight
 “Outside”, a single by bill wurtz, 2017
 "Outside" from Injury Reserve's By the Time I Get to Phoenix (2021)

See also
 
 
 The Outside (disambiguation)
 Inside (disambiguation)
 External (disambiguation)
 Out (disambiguation)
 Outdoor (disambiguation)